Melanagromyza is a genus of flies belonging to the family Agromyzidae.

The genus has cosmopolitan distribution.

Species:
 Melanagromyza achilleana Sehgal, 1971
 Melanagromyza aenea
Melanagromyza chaerophylli Spencer, 1969 

Melanagromyza aeneoventris   
Melanagromyza albocilia   
Melanagromyza angeliciphaga   
Melanagromyza chalcosoma   
Melanagromyza chaptaliae   
Melanagromyza cleomae   
Melanagromyza lappae   
Melanagromyza metallica   
Melanagromyza minimoides   
Melanagromyza nigrissima   
Melanagromyza obtusa   
Melanagromyza pubescens   
Melanagromyza ruelliae   
Melanagromyza sojae   
Melanagromyza verbesinae   
Melanagromyza virens   
Melanagromyza virginiensis   
Melanagromyza uricella  Spencer, 1981

References

Agromyzidae
Opomyzoidea genera